Aaro Kullervo Kiviperä (6 February 1912 – 11 July 1944) was a Finnish modern pentathlete. He competed at the 1936 Summer Olympics. He was killed in an air crash during World War II.

References

External links
 

1912 births
1944 deaths
Finnish male modern pentathletes
Olympic modern pentathletes of Finland
Modern pentathletes at the 1936 Summer Olympics
People from Seinäjoki
Finnish military personnel killed in World War II
Sportspeople from South Ostrobothnia